Bernhard "Bernd" Richter (born 3 April 1943 in Prague) is a German politician and retired Oberstudienrat.

From 1993 until 1995  Richter was the leader of the ödp, or Ecological Democratic Party.

Born in Prague, he currently lives in the Black Forest town Schramberg.

References

1943 births
Living people
Politicians from Prague
German Bohemian people
Ecological Democratic Party politicians